Dinychidae is a family of mites in the order Mesostigmata.

Taxonomy
 Genus Castriimonaspis W. Hirschmann, 1984
 Castriimonaspis castrii (Hirschmann, 1972)
 Genus Clausiadinychus Sellnick, 1930
 Clausiadinychus cristatus Sellnick, 1930
 Clausiadinychus pulcherrimus Hutu, 1991
 Clausiadinychus quadricaudatus Hirschmann, 1973
 Clausiadinychus sellnicki Hutu, 1991
 Clausiadinychus similicristatus Hirschmann, 1973
 Genus Dinychus Kramer, 1886
 Dinychus arcuatus (Trägårdh, 1943)
 Dinychus austeni (Hirst, 1923)
 Dinychus bincheaecarinatus Hirschmann, Wagrowska-Adamczyk & Zirngiebl-Nicol, 1984
 Dinychus camponoti Wisniewski & Hirschmann, 1983
 Dinychus carinatus Berlese, 1903
 Dinychus crassus Trägårdh, 1910
 Dinychus dentatus Ma, 2003
 Dinychus dilatatus Ma, 2000
 Dinychus feideri Hutu, 1973
 Dinychus fustipilis Sellnick, 1945
 Dinychus greensladeae Bloszyk & Halliday, 1995
 Dinychus hispanicus Hirschmann & Zirngiebl-Nicol, 1969
 Dinychus inermis (C.L. Koch, 1841)
 Dinychus kaluzi Masan, 1999
 Dinychus kielczewskii Wisniewski, 1992
 Dinychus kurosai Hiramatsu, 1978
 Dinychus micropunctatus Evans, 1955
 Dinychus onishii Hiramatsu, 1980
 Dinychus onishii Hiramatsu, 1980
 Dinychus ornatus (Fox, 1957)
 Dinychus perforatus Kramer, 1886
 Dinychus ruseki Athias-Binche, Bloszyk & Olszanowski, 1989
 Dinychus sellnicki Hutu, 1973
 Dinychus septentrionalis (Trägårdh, 1943)
 Dinychus stratus Sellnick, 1945
 Dinychus stratus Sellnick, 1945
 Dinychus subcorticalis Wisniewski & Hirschmann, 1994
 Dinychus sublaevis (Trägårdh, 1943)
 Dinychus tetraphyllus Berlese, 1903
 Dinychus tetraphyllus Berlese, 1903
 Dinychus undulatus Sellnick, 1945
 Dinychus woelkei Hirschmann & Zirngiebl-Nicol, 1969
 Genus Iphidinychus Berlese, 1913
 Iphidinychus balazyi Hirschmann & Wisniewski, 1992
 Iphidinychus gaieri (Schweizer, 1961)
 Iphidinychus johnstoni (Hirschmann, 1979)
 Iphidinychus kakumeiensis Hiramatsu & Hirschmann, 1992
 Iphidinychus manicatas Berlese, 1913
 Iphidinychus sudeticus Hirschmann, 1992
 Genus Leiodinychus Berlese, 1917
 Leiodinychus krameri (G. Canestrini & R. Canestrini, 1882)
 Genus Lindquistidiaspis W. Hirschmann, 1984
 Lindquistidiaspis lindquisti (Hirschmann, 1979)
 Genus Rotundadinychus W. Hirschmann, 1984
 Rotundadinychus rotundus (Hiramatsu & Hirschmann, 1977)
 Genus Sellnickiobovella W. Hirschmann, 1984
 Sellnickiobovella decui (Hutu, 1977)
 Sellnickiobovella hilli (Sellnick, 1970)
 Sellnickiobovella loksai (Hirschmann & Zirngiebl-Nicol, 1972)
 Sellnickiobovella marmorea (Fox, 1948)
 Sellnickiobovella negreai (Hutu, 1977)
 Genus Tricuspisobovella W. Hirschmann, 1984
 Tricuspisobovella magna (Hiramatsu & Hirschmann, 1977)
 Tricuspisobovella tricuspis (Sellnick, 1973)
 Genus Urodiaspis Berlese, 1916
 Urodiaspis engelhardti (Hirschmann & Zirngiebl-Nicol, 1969)
 Urodiaspis franzi Hirschmann & Zirngiebl-Nicol, 1969
 Urodiaspis honesta (Hiramatsu, 1983)
 Urodiaspis nicolae Hirschmann, 1984
 Urodiaspis pannonica Willmann, 1951
 Urodiaspis rectangulovata Berlese, 1916
 Urodiaspis sandankyoensis (Hiramatsu, 1979)
 Urodiaspis sejiformis Wisniewski & Hirschmann, 1993
 Urodiaspis shcherbakae (Hirschmann, 1972)
 Urodiaspis stammeri Hirschmann & Zirngiebl-Nicol, 1969
 Urodiaspis tectus (Kramer, 1876)
 Urodiaspis tetragonoides (Berlese, 1916)
 Urodiaspis yonakuniensis (Hiramatsu, 1979)
 Genus Urofossaaspis W. Hirschmann, 1984
 Urofossaaspis aokii (Hiramatsu, 1982)
 Urofossaaspis religiosa (Hiramatsu, 1979)
 Urofossaaspis similireligiosa (Hiramatsu, 1979)
 Genus Walkerdiaspis W. Hirschmann, 1984
 Walkerdiaspis walkeri (Hirschmann & Zirngiebl-Nicol, 1969)

References

Mesostigmata
Acari families